Jerzy Kaliszewski (June 8, 1912 – May 31, 1990) was a Polish actor, recipient of multiple awards.

Filmography 
 Doctor Murek (1939)
 Unvanquished City (1950)
 Youth of Chopin (1952)
 Stawka większa niż życie (1968)
 Boleslaw Smialy (1972)
 Inquest of Pilot Pirx (1979)

References 

Polish male actors
1912 births
1990 deaths